The Crimson Pirate is a 1952 British-American international co-production Technicolor tongue-in-cheek comedy-adventure film from Warner Bros. produced by Norman Deming and Harold Hecht, directed by Robert Siodmak, and starring Burt Lancaster, who also co-produced with Deming and Hecht. Co-starring in the film are Nick Cravat, Eva Bartok, Leslie Bradley, Torin Thatcher, and James Hayter. The film was shot in Ischia, the Bay of Naples and Teddington Studios. It makes the most of Lancaster's skills as a professional acrobat and his lifelong partnership with Cravat. Critics compared Lancaster  favorably with Douglas Fairbanks Sr.

The Crimson Pirate is set late in the 18th century, on the fictional Caribbean islands of San Pero and Cobra. A rebellion is underway on Cobra, led by the mysterious "El Libre". Pirate Captain Vallo captures the King's ship carrying His Majesty's envoy, Baron Gruda, on his way to crush the rebellion and destroy El Libre. Vallo proposes that they join forces to earn a fortune for the Captain and his buccaneer crew by infiltrating the rebels and betraying them for the reward. However, things do not go as planned after Vallo meets El Libre's beautiful daughter.

Plot
Late in the 18th century, Caribbean pirate Captain Vallo  and his crew capture a frigate of the King's navy. The ship is carrying Baron Gruda, a special envoy of the King on his way to the island of Cobra to crush a rebellion led by a man known as El Libre. Baron Gruda and Vallo come to an agreement: Vallo will release the Baron and his crew, but keep the frigate. In return, they will capture El Libre and bring him to the Baron for a sizable reward.

Vallo and his crew sail to Cobra, where the captain and his lieutenant, Ojo, go ashore and meet with the island's rebels, led by Pablo Murphy and El Libre's daughter Consuelo. Vallo and Ojo learn that El Libre has been captured and is in prison on the island of San Pero. After sailing to San Pero, Vallo impersonates the Baron and orders the prisoners released into his custody.

Consuelo is distraught to hear that Vallo intends on selling her, El Libre, and the professor to Baron Gruda. Consuelo now begs Vallo to come with them, but he refuses. Vallo's first mate, Humble Bellows, overhears this exchange, and turns against his captain for breaking his word. Vallo lets El Libre and Consuelo leave, but the King's guards are waiting, and El Libre is killed and Consuelo is captured. The pirates mutiny against Vallo, and Humble Bellows is elected their new captain.

Baron Gruda takes the pirates prisoner and forces Consuelo to agree to marry the governor of Cobra. Vallo intends to rescue Consuelo, but the professor convinces him to first enlist the island's cooperation. In order to defeat the well trained and well armed troops on Cobra, the professor have the rebels build a variety of futuristic weapons, such as tanks, Gatling guns, flamethrowers, a hot air balloon and a submarine. On the day of the wedding, the people overthrow the governor and his guards. A massive battle ensues, ending with the pirate ship destroyed, the Baron killed, and Vallo and Consuelo reunited.

Cast

Production
The original screenplay by Waldo Salt was rejected by the producers, fearing Salt's Communist ties. Christopher Lee, in his autobiography, claims that director Robert Siodmak changed the original screenplay:

Reception
A. H. Weiler of The New York Times described the film as "a slam-bang, action-filled Technicolored lampoon ... Any viewer with a drop of red blood in his veins and with fond memories of the Douglas Fairbanks Sr. school of derring-do should be happy to go on this last cruise of the crimson pirate." Variety called it "104 minutes of high-action entertainment." Edwin Schallert of the Los Angeles Times called it "a good, gaudy, robust sort of feature designed for audience enjoyment, at least that kind of audience which enjoys complete release. It has qualities that Douglas Fairbanks made famous in his time, Lancaster being a worthy successor to that mantle." Harrison's Reports wrote, "A very good swashbuckling pirate adventure comedy-melodrama, photographed in Technicolor. Its tongue-in-cheek treatment pokes fun at pictures of this type, and for that reason it should be enjoyed, not only by the action fans, but also by others who are willing to accept it for the good-natured spoof that it is." The Monthly Film Bulletin wrote, "The jokes are as unsophisticated as the adventure, and the combination of violence and slapstick makes for quite good fun. Burt Lancaster, fighting, swinging from ropes, chased and chasing, and throwing in a little female impersonation, has the acrobatic energy of a Fairbanks and keeps the film going with considerable good humour."

Legacy
Burt Lancaster and his old partner Nick Cravat made nine films together, the most popular being The Crimson Pirate and The Flame and the Arrow (1950). He kept Cravat on his payroll for life, as both a trainer as well as a co-star. Because Cravat's character in both films is mute, the belief persisted that in real life he was mute. Actually, Cravat was given no dialog lines because of his thick Brooklyn accent.

According to The Radio Times, the Disneyland ride "Pirates of the Caribbean" was inspired by The Crimson Pirate.

In the 1970s Lancaster attempted to make a sequel. He hired George MacDonald Fraser and later Jon Cleary to write scripts, but no film resulted from their efforts.

References

External links
 
 
 
 
 
 The Crimson Pirate Radio Times review
 The Crimson Pirate Empire review

1950s adventure comedy films
1952 comedy films
1952 films
American adventure comedy films
American swashbuckler films
1950s English-language films
Fictional pirates
Films directed by Robert Siodmak
Films produced by Burt Lancaster
Films produced by Harold Hecht
Films scored by William Alwyn
Films set in the 18th century
Films set in the Caribbean
Films set on islands
Pirate films
Norma Productions films
Warner Bros. films
1950s American films